There are several churches of Saint Mary the Crowned (Catholic churches devoted to Saint Mary the Crowned) in the province of Cádiz (Spain) and Gibraltar. The name may refer to:

 the Church of Saint Mary the Crowned (Medina-Sidonia) in Medina-Sidonia, Cádiz
 the Church of Saint Mary the Crowned (Jimena de la Frontera) in Jimena de la Frontera, Cádiz (the temple no longer exists, only a tower remains)
 the Church of Saint Mary the Crowned, now the Catholic cathedral of Gibraltar
 the Church of Saint Mary the Crowned (San Roque) in San Roque, Cádiz